Academic years at the College of Europe are known as promotions. Each promotion is named after an outstanding European. A list of the promotions follows:

 1949 Préparatoire (no name)
 1950-1951 Antoine de Saint-Exupéry
 1951-1952 Juan Vives
 1952-1953 Tomáš Garrigue Masaryk
 1953-1954 Erasmus
 1954-1955 Alcide De Gasperi
 1955-1956 Virgil
 1956-1957 Raoul Dautry
 1957-1958 Henry the Navigator
 1958-1959 Fridtjof Nansen
 1959-1960 Sully
 1960-1961 Saint-Simon
 1961-1962 Gottfried Wilhelm Leibniz
 1962-1963 August Vermeylen
 1963-1964 Thomas Paine
 1964-1965 Robert Schuman
 1965-1966 Thomas More
 1966-1967 George C. Marshall
 1967-1968 Comenius
 1968-1969 Konrad Adenauer
 1969-1970 William the Silent
 1970-1971 Winston Churchill
 1971-1972 Dante Alighieri
 1972-1973 Richard von Coudenhove-Kalergi
 1973-1974 Giuseppe Mazzini
 1974-1975 Aristide Briand
 1975-1976 Adam Jerzy Czartoryski
 1976-1977 Peter Paul Rubens
 1977-1978 Karl Renner
 1978-1979 Paul-Henri Spaak
 1979-1980 Salvador de Madariaga
 1980-1981 Jean Monnet
 1981-1982 Jan Willem Beyen
 1982-1983 Joseph Bech
 1983-1984 Jean Rey
 1984-1985 Madame de Staël
 1985-1986 Christopher Columbus
 1986-1987 William Penn
 1987-1988 Altiero Spinelli
 1988-1989 Christopher Dawson
 1989-1990 Denis de Rougemont
 1990-1991 Hans & Sophie Scholl
 1991-1992 Wolfgang Amadeus Mozart
 1992-1993 Charles IV
 1993-1994 Stefan Zweig
 1994-1995 Ramon Llull
 1995-1996 Walter Hallstein
 1996-1997 Alexis de Tocqueville
 1997-1998 Hendrik Brugmans
 1998-1999 Leonardo da Vinci
 1999-2000 Wilhelm & Alexander von Humboldt
 2000-2001 Aristotle
 2001-2002 Simon Stevin
 2002-2003 Bertha von Suttner
 2003-2004 John Locke
 2004-2005 Montesquieu
 2005-2006 Ludwig van Beethoven
 2006-2007 Nicolaus Copernicus.
 2007-2008 Anna Politkovskaja and Hrant Dink
 2008-2009 Marcus Aurelius
 2009-2010 Charles Darwin
 2010-2011 Albert Einstein
 2011-2012 Marie Curie
 2012-2013 Václav Havel
 2013-2014 Voltaire
 2014-2015 Falcone & Borsellino
 2015-2016 Frédéric Chopin
 2016-2017 John Maynard Keynes
 2017-2018 Simone Veil
 2018-2019 Manuel Marín
 2019-2020 Hannah Arendt
 2020-2021 Mário Soares
 2021-2022 Éliane Vogel-Polsky
 2022-2023 David Sassoli

Sources
 Book: The College of Europe. Fifty years of service to Europe, College of Europe publications. 2001.
 For recent years, available at the College of Europe website

College of Europe promotions
Promotions